The 2004 New York Mets season was the 43rd regular season for the Mets. They went 71-91 and finished 4th in the NL East. They were managed by Art Howe. They played home games at Shea Stadium.

Offseason
October 9, 2003: Marco Scutaro was selected off waivers by the Oakland Athletics from the New York Mets.
January 16, 2004: Kenny Kelly was signed as a free agent with the New York Mets.
January 29, 2004: Shane Spencer signed as a free agent with the New York Mets.
February 9, 2004: Ricky Bottalico was signed as a free agent with the New York Mets.

Regular season

Opening Day starters
 Mike Cameron
 Ricky Gutiérrez
 Cliff Floyd
 Mike Piazza
 Jason Phillips
 Karim García
 Tom Glavine
 Ty Wigginton
 Kaz Matsui

Notable transactions
April 3, 2004: Kenny Kelly was released by the New York Mets.
April 7, 2004: Ricky Bottalico was released by the New York Mets.
April 16, 2004: Ricky Bottalico was signed as a free agent with the New York Mets.
June 17, 2004: Dave Weathers was traded by the New York Mets with Jeremy Griffiths to the Houston Astros for Richard Hidalgo.
July 30, 2004: Justin Huber was traded by the New York Mets to the Kansas City Royals for José Bautista.
July 30, 2004: Scott Kazmir was traded by the New York Mets with Jose Diaz to the Tampa Bay Devil Rays for Bartolomé Fortunato and Víctor Zambrano.
July 30, 2004: Ty Wigginton, José Bautista and Matt Peterson were traded by the New York Mets to the Pittsburgh Pirates for Kris Benson and Jeff Keppinger.
August 6, 2004: Shane Spencer was released by the New York Mets.

Game log

Green indicates a win, pink indicates a loss, and gray indicates a postponement.

April

May

June

July

August

September

October

Roster

Season standings

National League East

Record vs. opponents

The Final Montreal Expos Game
Back in 1969, the New York Mets played the Montreal Expos in their first ever game. The game was played in New York.  The Montreal Expos final game was played in New York against the Mets as well.

Scorecard
October 3, Shea Stadium, Flushing, New York

Player stats

Batting

Starters by position
Note: Pos = Position; G = Games played; AB = At bats; H = Hits; Avg. = Batting average; HR = Home runs; RBI = Runs batted in

Other batters
Note: G = Games played; AB = At bats; H = Hits; Avg. = Batting average; HR = Home runs; RBI = Runs batted in

Pitching

Starting pitchers
Note: G = Games pitched; IP = Innings pitched; W = Wins; L = Losses; ERA = Earned run average; SO = Strikeouts

Other pitchers
Note: G = Games pitched; IP = Innings pitched; W = Wins; L = Losses; ERA = Earned run average; SO = Strikeouts

Relief pitchers
Note: G = Games pitched; W = Wins; L = Losses; SV = Saves; ERA = Earned run average; SO = Strikeouts

Farm system

References

External links
2004 New York Mets at Baseball Reference
2004 New York Mets at Baseball Almanac

New York Mets seasons
New York Mets
New York Mets
2000s in Queens